Alpha Delta Theta was a national collegiate sorority operating in the United States from 1919 to 1939. The sorority officially affiliated with Phi Mu fraternity on August 30, 1939.

Beginnings 

Ten female students at Transylvania College in Lexington, Kentucky formed Alpha Theta, a local sorority. Alpha Theta approached an unnamed national sorority about membership; their request was denied because of Alpha Theta's affiliation with Hamilton, a junior college for women. Having heard that the National Panhellenic Conference "declared the number of national sororities was too small", the Alpha Thetas decided to form their own national group. On November 10, 1921, Alpha Theta became Alpha Delta Theta (Lamb, p. 45), though "The Pledge Handbook of Alpha Delta Theta" cites the founding date as November 10, 1919.

A National Organization 

Within three years of existence, Alpha Delta Theta created 8 collegiate chapters. The sorority was granted "associate membership" by the National Panhellenic Conference in October 1923. Three years later, the sorority had full membership. "It was admitted to the Congress at an earlier date in its history than any other fraternity" (Lamb, p. 45).

On March 15, 1926, Alpha Delta Theta is incorporated as a national organization in the state of Kentucky (Lamb, p. 45).

Alpha Delta Theta grew quickly and with much strength in its twenty years of existence. Two years after its founding, the sorority began expanding to other campuses. The History of Phi Mu: The First 130 Years (1982) mentioned that Alpha Delta Theta had installed "a total of 25 collegiate chapters and 21 alumnae groups" (p. 45). The 1932- 1933 academic year was especially noteworthy for ADT, as "it had the distinction of breaking all fraternity records in scholarship... when 34 per cent of its chapters held first place in scholarship on their respective campuses" (Lamb, p. 45).

Merger with Phi Mu 

In spite of these gains, Alpha Delta Theta had come into its flowering somewhat late when compared to the other established chapters on its campuses, and thus faced several difficulties.

During the 1920s, while Alpha Delta Theta was prospering in the establishment of chapters, competing organizations had not been idle. There was a massive wave of building projects sweeping through those same venerable campuses where Alpha Delta Theta was placing its chapters. A decade, or sometimes multiple decades of alumni were able to bankroll and guarantee these projects where a startup chapter may not have such resources. Perhaps in a more kind economy, the passage of time would have resolved this in Alpha Delta Theta's favor, but the strain of the Great Depression meant that Greek participation dropped precipitously; larger chapters became shells of themselves, while small chapters were wiped out. Rather than a steep downturn followed by a quick, roaring reset to the economy, the Great Depression lingered, and more than anything, this led to a crisis where chapter after chapter failed: valued chapters on impressive campuses. National officers and chapter alumnae were faced with the potential of complete loss, a prospect that had been unthinkable just five years prior. (Lamb, p. 42)

Thus, Alpha Delta Theta was not able to survive the 1930s. "With some larger chapter houses that were unable to cope with the post-depression years and with the extensive campus building programs necessary to be competitive, its Grand Council decided to take an unprecedented step" (Lamb, p. 42). In the summer of 1938, Alpha Delta Theta officers sought out a national organization with history, values, and ideals similar to their own- Phi Mu was ultimately chosen. Carefully and quietly, Alpha Delta Theta and Phi Mu prepared the Letter of Agreement and other pertinent legal documents required for the distribution of Alpha Delta Theta's assets. "All officers, chapters and alumnae groups were contacted in January 1939, and by May the unanimous approval as required by both Constitutions, was in hand" (Lamb p. 42). "Unanimous approval" was an extraordinary feat in itself, and makes clear the focus that this crisis allowed these leaders. The summer was spent answering questions and resolving concerns about the merger. The affiliation became official on August 30, 1939 (Lamb, p. 43).

At the conclusion of the 26th session of the National Panhellenic Conference in White Sulphur Springs, West Virginia, on November 4, 1939, ADT's NPC delegate Violet Young Gentry announced her organization's affiliation with Phi Mu fraternity. The next day, Alpha Delta Theta corporation was dissolved. Phi Mu officers began initiating collegiate and alumnae members of Alpha Delta Theta. Phi Mu gained five new chapters through affiliation and eight through campus mergers. Four new alumnae groups from Alpha Delta Theta were installed as Phi Mu alumnae chapters; ADT's eighteen alumnae groups in cities where Phi Mu had alumnae chapters were disbanded and absorbed into Phi Mu (Lamb, p. 43).

Alpha Delta Theta Insignia and Traditions 

The local, Alpha Theta, used "Esse Non Videri" for the motto; the sweet pea for the flower; silver and Turquoise blue for the colors.

The badge of Alpha Delta Theta is described as being of yellow gold, Delta shaped, and "superimposed upon a gold key placed horizontally" (Lamb, p. 44). The center of the Delta was black enamel. Within the Delta, the Alpha was in the lower left hand angle, the Delta in the apex, and the theta in the lower right hand angle. Between the Alpha and theta was a "lighted candle in a candlestick.... with crossed palm branches above" (Lamb, p. 44). The border could have fifteen pearls with an emerald at each angle of the Delta.

The pledge pin was "a vertical bar of silver, bearing the raised letters, Alpha Delta Theta, one above the other" (Lamb, p. 44).

Emily H. Butterfield, in College Fraternity Heraldry, (1931) described the coat-of-arms as "argent; on a chief gules three keys of the first per fess, in base two palm branches saltirewise vert. Crest. A candle argent in candlestick flared of the same. Supporters. Two unicorns proper" (p. 28). The motto, a Greek phrase, was written on a banner under the shield. This coat-of-arms was adopted at the national convention in 1928- it is based entirely on ritualistic symbolism (Butterfield, p. 28).

The official publications were The Portals and The Silhouette (Lamb, p. 45)

The national philanthropy was the supplying of books and periodicals to Buffalo School, Moore's Creek, Kentucky (Lamb, p. 45). The school was remote, rural, and obviously in need of reading materials.

Founder's Day was celebrated every November 10. All members gave one dollar to the Alpha Delta Theta philanthropic project (Lamb, p. 45).

Chapters 
The chapters of Alpha Delta Theta at the time of the merger are as follows.  Active chapters at that time are in bold, inactive chapters noted in italics. Notes indicate whether two chapters merged or a new chapter was formed on the campus.

The Creed of Alpha Delta Theta 
To live each day as if it were the last:

To lift each moment to its clearest height;

To profit by the pages of the past

That I may judge between the wrong and right;

To hold my friends above my own desire,

And take the heavy end of friendship's load,

Yet blame them not if they perchance should tire,

And choose a gentler path, a smoother road;

To serve humanity as though 'twere God,

And see the human in His face divine;

To answer Truth's command and Beauty's nod,

And make their splendid consummations mine;

To dare to follow where I cannot lead-

This is my Alpha Delta Theta creed!

(Lamb, p 45)

References 
Butterfield, Emily H. (1931) College Fraternity Heraldry. The Collegiate Press: George Banta Publishing Co., Menasha, WI.
Lamb, Annadell Craig (1982) The History of Phi Mu: The First 130 Years. Phi Mu, Atlanta, GA with Maury Boyd and Associates, Compolith Graphics, Indianapolis, IN.
Baird's Manual of American College Fraternities, multiple editions.

Defunct former members of the National Panhellenic Conference
1919 establishments in Kentucky
Fraternities and sororities in the United States
Student organizations established in 1919